The Beach Bum is a 2019 American stoner comedy film written and directed by Harmony Korine and starring Matthew McConaughey, Snoop Dogg, Isla Fisher, Jimmy Buffett, with Zac Efron, Martin Lawrence, and Jonah Hill. The plot follows the adventures of stoner poet Moondog (McConaughey) in and around the Florida Keys as he tries to finish his new novel for the respect of his daughter and his share of his wife's estate after she dies in a car accident.

The Beach Bum had its world premiere at South by Southwest on March 9, 2019, and was theatrically released in the United States on March 29, 2019, by Neon. The film received mixed reviews from critics, with some calling it "joyous" and others describing it as an "epic goof", though McConaughey's performance received near-universal praise. The film was a box office disappointment, grossing only $4.6 million worldwide on a $5 million budget.

Plot
Substance abusing poet Moondog lives a hedonistic and pseudo-nomadic lifestyle in and around the Florida Keys while slowly working on his new book and enjoying life as a local legend despite the common opinion that he is past his prime. His escapades are funded by his wealthy wife Minnie, to the disapproval of their soon-to-wed daughter Heather and his agent Lewis. The promiscuous Moondog engages in sexual relationships with many women on his journeys, while Minnie engages in a secret affair with Moondog's friend, R&B singer Lingerie.

After arriving late to Heather's wedding in Miami because he was cheating on his wife, Moondog drunkenly gropes the groom, Frank, in front of the audience. Later, during a talk about Moondog's crude behavior, Minnie confesses her affair to her daughter. Meanwhile, Lingerie shows Moondog a potent strain of cannabis, endemic to an isolated pond in Jamaica, which he claims to be responsible for his success. During the reception, Moondog reconciles with Heather and Frank while they cut the cake. He later witnesses Minnie and Lingerie kissing and runs off. Minnie tracks down Moondog at a local bar, and the two enjoy a night of intoxicated karaoke and dancing; culminating with Minnie drunkenly driving into oncoming traffic. Moondog escapes with minor injuries but Minnie dies in the hospital shortly after.

Half of Minnie's estate goes to Heather, while Moondog's half is frozen and placed in an escrow account until he has finished his novel. In retaliation, and due to Lewis' refusal to book seminars for Moondog due to his work ethic, Moondog and a group of homeless people break into and trash Minnie's mansion. To avoid prison time, he agrees to a year of rehabilitation but breaks out of the facility with a pyromaniac named Flicker. The two engage in a night of debauchery and part ways as Moondog makes his way back to Miami.

He bumps into an old friend and alleged Vietnam veteran dubbed "Captain Wack" who offers Moondog an opportunity to co-captain dolphin tours around the outer Keys. Captain Wack decides to swim with the dolphins during a tour before realizing too late that they are great white sharks, one of which attacks and severs his foot. Now back in Miami and wanted by the law, Moondog reconnects with Lingerie, who confesses to Moondog about his affair with Minnie but claims Minnie truly loved Moondog. After Lingerie and Jimmy Buffett tell Moondog about a respective dream and experience the two had concerning crossdressing to avoid detection, Moondog begins to do just that. The police eventually bear down on Lingerie's property, prompting Moondog to flee to Key West with Lingerie's help and an undisclosed amount of the Jamaican weed.

Inspired, Moondog completes his book, a poetic memoir titled The Beach Bum. The book is universally lauded and nets Moondog a Pulitzer Prize. The lawyer for Minnie's estate informs him that his inheritance has been unfrozen and he now has full access to the money, which Moondog demands to be in physical cash and placed on a large sailboat. During a party to celebrate his wealth, Moondog lights the money on fire, triggering several fireworks and causing an explosion. Moondog survives unscathed, but the crowd is too concerned with the raining money to care as he drifts away on a boat laughing.

Cast

 Matthew McConaughey as Moondog, Minnie's husband and Heather's father
 Snoop Dogg as Lingerie ("Rie"), an R&B singer and Minnie's lover
 Isla Fisher as Minnie, Moondog's wife and Heather's mother
 Stefania LaVie Owen as Heather, Minnie and Moondog's daughter and Frank's wife
 Martin Lawrence as Captain Wack, a dolphin tour guide and claimed Vietnam War veteran
 Zac Efron as Flicker, a drug rehabilitation patient and pyromaniac
 Jonah Hill as Lewis, Moondog's agent
 Jimmy Buffett as himself, a singer and friend of Moondog and Lingerie
 Donovan Williams as Rasta, Lingerie's friend and pilot, who claims to be 98% blind and have glaucoma in both eyes
 David Bennett as Homeless Phil, friend of Moondog who gets caught by the police when they trash Minnie's mansion
 Joshua Ritter as Frank (nicknamed "Limp Dick"), Heather's husband
 John Morris as Cash Register Guy, employee of a convenience store who Moondog talks to on his way to Miami
 Jo Marie Payton as the Judge, who mandates Moondog go to rehab
 Leah Van Dale as Samantha
 Ricky Diaz as Jonathan the Best Man
 Bertie Higgins as himself, a singer and friend of Moondog

Production
Following the release of Spring Breakers and time spent living in Florida, writer-director Harmony Korine penned The Beach Bum, which is "based loosely on a set of characters he was hanging out with in the Keys". Journalist Zach Baron noted Korine "wrote the film swiftly, and then, as he did with Spring Breakers, Korine cast a mix of well-known actors", such as Matthew McConaughey, Jonah Hill, Zac Efron, Martin Lawrence, Jimmy Buffett, Snoop Dogg, Isla Fisher—"and real-life Florida denizens".

Speaking about the connection between the cast of Hollywood stars and the local grit of Florida, Korine said, "I like when they meet in the middle [...] Like when all the secondary characters, and all the locations, all the color, the sky, everything, it affects the main roles in a way. It's almost like a chemical reaction." McConaughey described the character of Moondog as "a verb. A folk poet. A character in a Bob Dylan song dancing through life's pleasure and pain knowing every interaction is another 'note' in the tune of his life." Similarly, Korine described the protagonist as a man that "lives for the second. There's no self-censor. He's just a sensualist. Whatever feels good, he just acts on it. So he does good, and he does bad." The role of Moondog was written for Gary Oldman, but he turned it down.

John Lesher, Steve Golin, Charles-Marie Anthonioz, Mourad Belkeddar and Nicholas Lhermitte produced the film under the LeGrisbi Productions, Anonymous Content and Iconoclast banners. Rocket Science handled international sales commencing at the European Film Market in Berlin.

Principal photography began in November 2017. Throughout the filming process, the cast brought their own creative direction to their characters. Snoop Dogg decided that rather than play himself, as written in Korine's script, he needed to take on a new character.

Additional strange inspiration came to Korine, as while eating a panini sandwich, the director thought that the pattern would "look good on Zac's face". The quote later went viral, when New Yorker columnist Lauren Leibowitz tweeted about the design for Efron's beard. While appearing on Jimmy Kimmel Live, McConaughey recounted how Snoop Dogg swapped out fake prop marijuana with "Snoop Weed". McConaughey said of the experience "the next nine hours were a whole lot of fun, but I don't believe we used one word in the English language".

Moondog reads Richard Brautigan's "A Beautiful Poem" twice in the film: once in the beginning on stage at a bar, and the second near the end of the film at an awards ceremony. Moondog admits to Lingerie in the film that he plagiarized D.H. Lawrence and won a poetry contest when he was younger. Moondog also resembles Brautigan: Brautigan was a popular poet in the 1960s, whose popularity waned in later decades, as well as an alcoholic. Thus, it is not clear whether "A Beautiful Poem" is intended to be an example of Moondog's original poetry or Moondog plagiarizing Brautigan. Moondog also quotes D.H. Lawrence's "Piano", Charles Baudelaire's "Get Drunk", and Walt Whitman's "Song at Sunset".

Release
In May 2017, Neon acquired distribution rights to the film. It had its world premiere at South by Southwest on March 9, 2019, and was theatrically released on March 29, 2019.

Reception

Box office
In the United States and Canada, The Beach Bum was released alongside Dumbo and Unplanned, and was projected to gross $2–4 million from 1,100 theaters in its opening weekend. The film made $650,000 on its first day, including $200,000 from Thursday night previews. It ended up debuting to just $1.8 million, the lowest wide opening of McConaughey's career.

Critical response
On review aggregator Rotten Tomatoes, the film has an approval rating of 57% based on 125 reviews, with an average rating of 5.4/10. The website's critical consensus reads, "The role of a lifetime for Matthew McConaughey, The Beach Bum is set apart by Harmony Korine's distinctive style, but that isn't always enough to offset the unfocused story." On Metacritic, the film has a weighted average score of 55 out of 100, based on 31 critics, indicating "mixed or average reviews". Audiences polled by PostTrak gave the film an average 2.5 out of 5 stars and a 36% "definite recommend".

Rolling Stones David Fear wrote, "Matthew McConaughey goes full 'just keep livin' in this insane ode to fear, loathing and the art of the permanent happy hour." Critic Brian Tallerico of RogerEbert.com noted "the shaggy dog nature of this film, one that mimics its protagonist's neverending belief that everything is just gonna be all right, all right becomes almost transcendent... The Beach Bum works by never losing its tonal statement that all that really matters is what matters to you...man." A. A. Dowd of The A.V. Club gave the film a B−, noting how, "there's little plot and even less in the way of conflict... There's a collage quality to Korine's filmmaking—a sense that he's always just collecting moments, cobbling together scenes from the endless supply of improvised festivity that presumably erupted on set".

References

External links
 
 
 
 

2019 films
American comedy films
American independent films
American films about cannabis
Films scored by John Debney
Films directed by Harmony Korine
Films set in Florida
Films about writers
Films about poets
Neon (distributor) films
Stoner films
Anonymous Content films
Films about father–daughter relationships
2010s English-language films
2019 independent films
2010s American films